The contraceptive sponge combines barrier and spermicidal methods to prevent conception. Sponges work in two ways. First, the sponge is inserted into the vagina, so it can cover the cervix and prevent any sperm from entering the uterus. Secondly, the sponge contains spermicide.

The sponges are inserted vaginally prior to intercourse and must be placed over the cervix to be effective.
Sponges provide no protection from sexually transmitted infections.  Sponges can provide contraception for multiple acts of intercourse over a 24-hour period, but cannot be reused beyond that time or once removed.

Effectiveness
Sponge's effectiveness is 91% if used perfectly by women who never gave birth, and 80% if used perfectly by women who have given at least one birth. Since it is hard to use the sponge perfectly every time having vaginal sex, the real effectiveness of the method is actually lower than the figures mentioned. It is advised to combine sponges with other birth control methods, like withdrawal of penis before ejaculation or condoms.

Use
To use the sponge, wet the sponge and squeeze it, fold it and put it in the vagina covering the cervix. A sponge works for 24 hours once put in, during which the female can have sex multiple times. Once the sponge is pulled out, it should not be reused and should be trashed, not flushed. The sponge should be left in place for 6 hours after having sex. A sponge should not be in the vagina for more than 30 hours.

Spermicide
Sponges are a physical barrier, trapping sperm and preventing their passage through the cervix into the reproductive system. The spermicide is an important component of pregnancy prevention.

Side effects
People sensitive to Nonoxynol-9, an ingredient in the spermicide used in the sponge, may experience unpleasant irritation and may face increase risk of sexually transmitted diseases. Sponge users may have a slightly higher risk of Toxic shock syndrome.

In popular culture
Shortly after they were taken off the U.S. market, the sponge was featured in an episode of the sitcom Seinfeld titled "The Sponge". In the episode, Elaine Benes conserves her remaining sponges by choosing to not have intercourse unless she is certain her partner is "sponge-worthy". This was later revisited in the series finale when the pharmacist testifies against Elaine and her morality for buying a whole case of the sponges.
The film Clueless features a scene where the characters Dionne and Tai are discussing sex and Dionne is heard to ask Tai if the sponge would still work if the user has sex in water.
On the TV series My So-Called Life, the doctor tells Angela to use a sponge if she is thinking of having sex.
In the TV series Downton Abbey, Anna Bates, lady's maid to Lady Mary Crawley, buys a 1920s contraceptive sponge for her mistress. Later the device is found by Anna's husband John Bates who assumes she is using it herself.

References

External links
The Contraceptive Sponge – DrDonnica.com

Barrier contraception
Spermicide
Products introduced in 1983